Dew Drop is an unincorporated community in Nevada County, California. It lies at an elevation of 1457 feet (444 m).

References

Unincorporated communities in California
Unincorporated communities in Nevada County, California